Uncial 079 (in the Gregory-Aland numbering), ε 16 (Soden), is a Greek uncial manuscript of the New Testament, dated paleographically to the 6th century.

Description 

The codex contains a small part of the Gospel of Luke 7:39-49; 24:10-19 on 2 parchment leaves (31 cm by 25 cm). It is written in two columns per page, 23 lines per page.

It is a palimpsest, the upper later text was written in Georgian language. 

The Greek text of this codex is mixed with predominate element the Byzantine text-type. Aland placed it in Category III.

Currently it is dated by the INTF to the 6th century.

The text of the palimpsest was deciphered and edited by Constantin von Tischendorf in 1846. It was also examined by Kurt Treu.

The codex now is located at the Russian National Library (Suppl. Gr. 13, fol. 8-10) in Saint Petersburg.

See also 
 List of New Testament uncials
 Textual criticism

References

Further reading 

 Constantin von Tischendorf, Monumenta sacra inedita I (Leipzig: 1846), pp. XIII-XIX, 21 ff. 
 Kurt Treu, Die Griechischen Handschriften des Neuen Testaments in der USSR; eine systematische Auswertung des Texthandschriften in Leningrad, Moskau, Kiev, Odessa, Tbilisi und Erevan, T & U 91 (Berlin: 1966), pp. 292-293. 

Greek New Testament uncials
6th-century biblical manuscripts
Palimpsests
National Library of Russia collection